The Leeds Northern Railway (LNR), originally the Leeds and Thirsk Railway, was an English railway company that built and opened a line from Leeds to Stockton via Harrogate and Thirsk. In 1845 the Leeds and Thirsk Railway received permission for a line from Leeds to Thirsk, part of which opened in 1848, but problems building the Bramhope Tunnel delayed trains operating into Leeds until 1849.

The Leeds and Thirsk Railway Company changed its name to the Leeds Northern Railway on 3 July 1851 before its line to Stockton opened. The company formed an alliance with the West Hartlepool Harbour & Railway and was involved in a price war with the York, Newcastle & Berwick Railway (YN&BR). A merger of the YN&BR with the LNR and the York & North Midland Railway was accepted by LNR shareholders, and by Royal Assent on 31 July 1854 the three companies merged to become the North Eastern Railway.

Today, sections of the former Leeds Northern Railway line form the Harrogate Line between Leeds and Harrogate, and the Northallerton to Stockton Line.

Leeds and Thirsk Railway

The GNER withdrew its bill after it was leased by the Newcastle & Darlington Junction Railway, which was controlled by the railway financier George Hudson. The Leeds and Thirsk Railway Act received royal assent on 21 July 1845 and construction started on 20 October 1845.

Mineral traffic was carried between Ripon and Thirsk on 5 January 1848, and this section officially opened on 31 May with public services starting the following day. The section between Weeton and Wormald Green opened on 1 September and was connected to the line at Ripon on 13 September. The York & North Midland Railway opened Harrogate station in the town centre at Brunswick, which was accessed via a line over the Crimple Viaduct. The Leeds and Thirsk Line passed under the viaduct en route to Starbeck. Although the station at Brunswick was more convenient, the Leeds and Thirsk offered a shorter journey to Leeds from Starbeck.

Tunnellers encountered large quantities of water that had to be pumped out and many workers died during its construction. A memorial in the form of a replica of the tunnel's northern portal is in Otley churchyard. The completed line opened on 9 July 1849 when three trains carried 2000 shareholders from Leeds to Thirsk and back.

Extension to Stockton
Under pressure from Hudson the route was changed so that the GNER would be used between Thirsk and Northallerton and this Act received royal assent on 16 July 1846. The Leeds and Thirsk returned for permission for a direct line from Melmerby to Northallerton which was approved on 22 July 1848. The Leeds and Thirsk Railway received permission to change its name to the Leeds Northern Railway on 3 July 1851.

The East & West Yorkshire Junction Railway (E&WYJR) began constructing a line from York to Knaresborough in 1847, opening to a temporary station at Hay Park Lane on 30 October 1848 before being taken over by the York & North Midland on 1 July 1851.

The northern end of the line between Leeds and Stockton passed under the York, Newcastle & Berwick Line, under a bridge that was built without interfering with the train services above. At Yarm a  viaduct, designed by Thomas Grainger and John Bourne of Edinburgh, was built across the River Tees. The line was opened formally on 15 May 1852 and public traffic started on 2 June 1852. After crossing to the south of the station, the railways each had two tracks running through the station and a single island platform was built between them and one side used by S&DR trains, the other by the Leeds Northern. Rather than allow trains to approach the platform line from either direction, the Board of Trade inspecting officer ruled that trains approaching on a line without a platform must first pass through and then reverse into the platform line.

Locomotives

North Eastern Railway

T.E. Harrison, who had become General Manager and Engineer of the YN&BR, looked at merger of the YN&BR with Leeds Northern and York & North Midland as the answer. With a proposal that the shares of the three companies remain separate, replaced by Berwick Capital Stock, York Capital Stock and Leeds Capital Stock, and dividends paid from pooled revenue, the agreement of the three boards was reached in November 1852. The deal was rejected by the shareholders of the Leeds Northern, who felt their seven per cent share of revenue too low; joint operation was agreed instead of a full merger and Harrison appointed General Manager.

A curve connecting the line with the former GNER line at Northallerton was opened on 1 January 1856, and until 1901 Harrogate to Stockton trains were diverted via Thirsk and Northallerton, the line via Pickhill being operated as a branch. The former Leeds Northern station at Northallerton closed that year. The former Leeds Northern and York & North Midland lines in Harrogate were connected, the permission being given by an Act on 8 August 1859. The station at Brunswick was replaced by the current Harrogate railway station on a new line that branched from the Y&NMR line in town to the former Leeds Northern line north of Starbeck. Another new line, connecting from north of Pannal station to end of Crimple Viaduct, gave the former Leeds Northern Line access to this station.

As a result of the Railways Act 1921, on 1 January 1923 the North Eastern Railway became part of the London and North Eastern Railway (LNER). Britain's railways were nationalised on 1 January 1948 and the former York, Newcastle & Berwick lines were placed under the control of British Railways.

Legacy

The Harrogate Line follows the former Leeds and Thirsk Line from Leeds to Pannal via the Bramhope Tunnel and crosses the River Wharfe on the Arthington Viaduct. It joins the former Y&NMR Line and crosses the Crimple Viaduct. Services pass over the link between the 1882 Harrogate station and Starbeck station before taking the branch and crossing the Nidd Viaduct at Knaresborough and the E&WJR to York.

The direct line between Pannal and Starbeck closed in 1951 and the line between Melmerby and Thirsk closed in 1959. The former Y&NMR Line to Church Fenton closed on 6 January 1964 to passengers and the Leeds Northern line from Starbeck to Northallerton closed to passengers in 1967, though a limited number of goods trains used this line to Ripon until 1969. Hornbeam Park railway station opened in Harrogate in 1992.

Eighteen freight trains a day use the route to travel between the East Coast Main Line and Teesside and Tyneside.

Notes and references

Notes

References

Sources

North Eastern Railway (UK)
Standard gauge railways in England
Railway companies disestablished in 1854
Railway companies established in 1845